Emil Kutterer (11 November 1898 – 13 July 1974) was a German footballer. He was part of Germany's team at the 1928 Summer Olympics, but he did not play in any matches.

References

External links

1898 births
1974 deaths
Footballers from Karlsruhe
German footballers
Germany international footballers
Olympic footballers of Germany
Footballers at the 1928 Summer Olympics
FC Bayern Munich footballers
Karlsruher FV players
German football managers
Association football defenders
20th-century German people